LY-320,135 is a drug used in scientific research which acts as a selective antagonist of the cannabinoid receptor CB1. It was developed by Eli Lilly and Company in the 1990s. 

LY-320,135 displays fairly good selectivity, with a binding affinity for CB1 around 70x stronger than for CB2, but both its potency and selectivity are modest compared to newer agents, and at higher doses it also binds to a range of non-cannabinoid receptors. However LY-320,135 is still fairly widely used in research, particularly for elucidating the mechanisms by which many CB1 antagonists act as inverse agonists at higher doses.

References 

Cannabinoids
CB1 receptor antagonists
Benzofuran ethers at the benzene ring
Resorcinol ethers
Aromatic ketones
Benzonitriles
Eli Lilly and Company brands